Robert Swinburne may refer to:

Robert Swinburne (c. 1327 – 1391), MP for Essex
Robert Swinburne (born c.1376), MP for Newcastle-upon-Tyne